Ralli Ben-Yehuda (ראלי בן יהודה; born September 26, 1934) is an Israeli former Olympic gymnast.

She was born in Tel Aviv and is Jewish.

Gymnastics career

Ben-Yehuda competed for Israel at the 1960 Summer Olympics in Rome, Italy, at the age of 25. She placed 81st in the individual all-around, 72nd on the floor exercise, and 86th on the balance beam, and tied for 96th on the horse vault and 62nd on the uneven bars. When she competed in the Olympics, she was 5-1.5 (157 cm) tall and weighed 115 lbs (52 kg).

References

External links
 

Israeli female artistic gymnasts
Living people
Olympic gymnasts of Israel
Gymnasts at the 1960 Summer Olympics
1934 births
Jewish gymnasts
People from Tel Aviv